Fauzi bin Abdul Rahman (Jawi: فوزي بن عبدالرحمن) (Born 27 August 1946) is a Malaysian politician. He is a former Deputy Minister (1995-1999) and former Pahang state chief of the People's Justice Party (PKR), a component in the Pakatan Harapan (PH) coalition. He is also a former Pahang State Assemblyman for Beserah (1999-2004).

Formerly, he was a member of United Malays National Organisation (UMNO) of Barisan Nasional (BN) coalition before he quits on 23 July 2008 to join PKR.

Fauzi last contested Sungai Lembing state seat in 2018 general election but lose to BN candidate from UMNO, in a three-corner fight with candidate from Pan-Malaysian Islamic Party (PAS).

Controversies and issues
In April 2001, Fauzi lodged a police report alleging that Mohd Khalil Yaakob misappropriated state resources as Menteri Besar of Pahang then.

Family
His father was a former minister of Malaysia : Almarhum Dr Abdul Rahman Talib.

Election results

Honours

Honour of Malaysia
  :
 Medal of the Order of the Defender of the Realm (PPN) (1978)
  :
  Member of Order of the Crown of Pahang (AMP) (1980)
  Knight Companion of the Order of the Crown of Pahang (DIMP) - Dato' (1988)
 Grand Knight of the Order of Sultan Ahmad Shah of Pahang (SSAP) - Dato' Sri (2018)

References 

1946 births
Living people
People from Pahang
Malaysian people of Malay descent
Malaysian Muslims
People's Justice Party (Malaysia) politicians
Former United Malays National Organisation politicians
Members of the Dewan Rakyat
Members of the Pahang State Legislative Assembly
21st-century Malaysian politicians
Medallists of the Order of the Defender of the Realm